The Russian Embassy School in Brussels ( or Школа Посольства России в Бельгии) is a Russian international school in Uccle, Brussels, Belgium.

References

External links
  Russian Embassy School in Brussels

Belgium
Russian
Uccle
Belgium–Soviet Union relations
Secondary schools in Brussels